Tatosoma monoviridisata is a species of moth in the family Geometridae first described by Charles E. Clarke in 1920. It is endemic to New Zealand.

References

Trichopterygini
Moths described in 1920
Moths of New Zealand
Endemic fauna of New Zealand
Endemic moths of New Zealand